Lamone-Cadempino railway station is a railway station in the Swiss canton of Ticino. The station is located on the border between the municipalities of Lamone and Cadempino, and serves both. The station is on the original line of the Swiss Federal Railways Gotthard railway between Bellinzona and Lugano. This line has been by-passed by the Ceneri Base Tunnel since 2020, and most trains between Lugano and Bellinzona now use the base tunnel rather than passing through Lamone-Cadempino station.

Services 
 the following services stop at Lamone-Cadempino:

References

External links 
 
 

Railway stations in Ticino
Swiss Federal Railways stations